Gnathoncus nanus  is a species of clown beetle in the Histeridae family.

References

Histeridae
Beetles described in 1790